10K may refer to:
10000 (number), the natural number following 9999 and preceding 10001
10K run, a common road running race distance
10,000 metres, a running track race distance
10-K Thirst Quencher, a sports drink
Form 10-K, a form used by the Securities and Exchange Commission
10K, la década robada, Argentine book by Jorge Lanata
10K Plan, a plan by Jerry Brown to attract 10,000 new residents to Oakland, California
10K, character in Z Nation
10K resolution a digital video format having a horizontal resolution of approximately 10,000 pixels

See also
K (disambiguation)